Loddon Nature Reserve is a   nature reserve on the edge of the village of Twyford in Berkshire. It is managed by the Berkshire, Buckinghamshire and Oxfordshire Wildlife Trust.

Geography and site
Loddon Nature Reserve is located on the site of a former gravel pit which is now flooded and has woody surrounds. The flooded gravel pit has several islands.

Fauna

The site has the following fauna:

Birds

Flora

The site has the following flora:

Plants

Lythrum salicaria
Iris pseudacorus

References

Parks and open spaces in Berkshire
Nature reserves in Berkshire
West Berkshire District
Berkshire, Buckinghamshire and Oxfordshire Wildlife Trust